Goessel High School is a public secondary school in Goessel, Kansas, United States.  It is operated by Goessel USD 411 school district.  It is the sole public high school for the community of Goessel and nearby rural areas of Marion / McPherson / Harvey Counties.

Academics
Goessel High School has been recognized in 2007 and 2008 by U.S. News & World Report as a Bronze Medal Finalist in their Best of U.S. High Schools.

Extracurricular activities

Scholars Bowl
In February 2012, Goessel won the Scholars Bowl at the Regional Tournament in Ell-Saline. In Class 1A Division I, Goessel finished 4th after winning their group in pool play. One year later, Goessel's team again made it back to the State Championships and were able to one up the team from last year finishing 3rd overall.The team won their only state championship in 2015.

Athletics
Goessel High School offers several athletic programs including basketball (boys and girls), cross country (boys and girls), football (8-man), golf (boys and girls), track and field (boys and girls), and volleyball. The school competes in the Wheat State League and is a member of the KSHSAA.

Boys basketball
In 1988, the boys basketball team won the 1A state championship.

Volleyball
The volleyball team won the class 1A Kansas state championship in 2015.

Cross Country
The boys' cross country team won the 1A state meet in 1976, Goessel's first team state championship.  The girls' cross country team won the 1A state meet in 2016.

See also
 List of high schools in Kansas
 List of unified school districts in Kansas

References

External links
 Official webpage
 USD 411 School District Boundary Map, KDOT
 Goessel City Map, KDOT

Public high schools in Kansas
Schools in Marion County, Kansas
Public middle schools in Kansas